The following lists events that happened in 2008 in Djibouti.

Incumbents
President: Ismaïl Omar Guelleh
Prime Minister: Dileita Mohamed Dileita

Events

June
 June 2 - The United Nations Security Council goes on a mission to Africa with the first leg of the mission to Djibouti to discuss the Somali Civil War.
 June 14 - The French Defense Ministry announces France is increasing its military presence in Djibouti following border clashes with Eritrea. France has a mutual defense agreement with Djibouti.

October
 October 24 - The government of Djibouti has said that the country will have to go to war with Eritrea unless the United Nations acts to resolve growing tension over a border dispute.

References

 
Years of the 21st century in Djibouti
Djibouti
Djibouti
2000s in Djibouti